Hoplopteryx is an extinct genus of Trachichthyidae from the Cretaceous.

Biology
Hoplopteryx has a dorsal fin supported by nine unjointed, bony rays, deeply forked, homocercal tail, a moderately developed anal fin, and a pelvic fin located well forward. The snout is quite short, the eyes fairly large, and both jaws of the upturned mouth hold small teeth.

Habitat
Hoplopteryx was a marine fish, living in shallow chalk seas.

Size
Hoplopteryx was at a typical length 27 cm.

Sources
 Fossils (Smithsonian Handbooks) by David Ward (Page 219)

External links
Hoplopteryx in the Paleobiology Database

Trachichthyidae
Prehistoric ray-finned fish genera
Cretaceous fish of North America